Otto-Henry, Elector Palatine, (10 April 1502, Amberg – 12 February 1559, Heidelberg) a member of the Wittelsbach dynasty was Count Palatine of Palatinate-Neuburg from 1505 to 1557 and prince elector of the  Palatinate from 1556 to 1559. He was a son of Rupert, Count Palatine, third son of Philip, Elector Palatine; and of Elizabeth of Bavaria-Landshut, daughter of George of Bavaria.

Life
As grandson of George of Bavaria, the young Otto Henry became Count Palatine of the new duchy of Palatinate-Neuburg after the Palatinate had lost the Landshut War of Succession against Albert IV, Duke of Bavaria. After the so-called Kölner Spruch (Verdict of Cologne) the duchy was created from the territories north of the Danube for Otto Henry and Philipp, the sons of Ruprecht of the Palatinate. While they were minors, their grandfather Philip, Elector Palatine, ruled the duchy until his death in 1508, followed by Elector Frederick II, their uncle. 

In 1541 elector Otto Henry converted to Lutheranism and his palace chapel at Neuburg Castle was the first newly built protestant church of all, consecrated on 25 April 1543 by the reformed theologian Andreas Osiander. 

Otto Henry ordered upgrading of Neuburg Castle, patronised the arts and was involved in several conflicts, due to his expensive holding of court a huge burden of debts caused his bankruptcy until he inherited the Electoral Palatinate in 1556. In the 1550s Otto Henry established the Bibliotheca Palatina.

In September 1546 Neuburg was occupied by the troops of Charles V, Holy Roman Emperor as Otto Henry had supported the Schmalkaldic League. In 1552 in occasion of the Peace of Passau Otto Henry could return to Neuburg. As Elector from 1556 he then re-introduced the Protestant Reformation.

Otto Henry married Susanna of Bavaria (1502–43), daughter of Albert IV, Duke of Bavaria, on October 16, 1529 in Neuburg an der Donau. He was her second husband after Casimir, Margrave of Brandenburg-Bayreuth.  They had no children, but Susanna brought five of her eleven children to the marriage. She left him a widower 14 years later in 1543.

Otto Henry died in Heidelberg in 1559. He is buried in the Heiliggeistkirche in Heidelberg.

Ancestors

References

External links 

 
 
 
 Hans Kilian, Drawings from Elector Ottheinrich's alchemical laboratory
 Digital exhibition of the Ottheinrich-Bible

1502 births
1559 deaths
House of Wittelsbach
Prince-electors of the Palatinate
Burials at the Church of the Holy Spirit, Heidelberg